Girija Shankar Sharma (born March 1938 in Bikaner, India) is a historian and scholar of Rajasthani as well as Hindi language literature. He received a Master of Arts (M.A.) in History from Dungar College and a Doctor of Philosophy (Ph. D.) from the University of Rajasthan, Jaipur. He joined the Rajasthan State Archives (Bikaner) in 1963 and retired as Deputy Director of the Archives in 1996.

Biography
Marwari Vypari, ek aitehasik aur samajik vivechan (The role of Marwari traders specially their financial and social aspects related to former Bikaner state in 19th century), Publisher: Krishna Janasevi, Dauji Road, Bikaner 1988.
Itihaas-Ro-Saach (Historical articles about Rajasthan in the Rajasthani language) Publisher: Aacharya Tulsi Rajasthani Sodh Sansthan, Gangashahar, Bikaner 2002.
Hamarey Purodha: Dr Dasharatha Sharma (On the life and works of Dasharatha Sharma, Hindi author and historian), in Hindi (includes passages in Rajasthani language). Publisher: Rajasthan Sahitya Akadami, Udaipur 2003, 
Sources on social and economic history of Rajasthan, 17th-20th century A.D., Publisher: Vikas Prakashan, Bikaner 2005.
Bikaner ki chitrankan parampara (Traditional wall and door decorative arts in Bikaner), in Hindi. Publisher: Jawahar Kala Kendra evam Kalasan Prakashan, Bikaner 2005.
Sindhyacha Dayaldas (On the life and works of a 19th-century Rajasthani poet, includes a sampling of his works), in Rajasthani language. Publisher: Sahitya Akademi, New Delhi 2006. 
Ehasan ka ehasas: Kahani sangraha (Short stories) in Hindi, Publisher: Prakhyata Prakashan, Bikaner 2007.
Sannatta Cheerte Shabd: (Hindi Poetry) Publisher: Prakhyata Prakashan, Bikaner 2007.
Rajasthan mein shiksha ka itihaas (History of education in Rajasthan) Publisher: Kalashan Prakashan, Bikaner 2009.
Marwari Drishti-Pratidrishti (A critical analysis of the Marwari community in the 19th century). Publisher: Vikas Prakashan, Nagri Bhandar, Bikaner 2012.

Co-Edited works
Deshdarpana: Bikaner Rajya ka ithihas/ Sindhyacha Dayaldas, (Monograph in Rajasthani on the Rajasthani poet) Principal Editor: J. K. Jain, Editors: Girija Shankar Sharma, Sanatkumar Swami, Satyanarayan Swami, Publisher: Rajasthan Rajya Abhilekhgara 1989.
Kurmavilasa: Jaipur Rajya ke Kachvaha Shaskon ka itihas/Chanda kavi virachit (Extended narrative poem on rulers of the Princely State of Jaipur, in Rajasthani language). Publisher: Rajasthan Rajya Abhilekhgar 1991.

External links
Permalink to Marwari Vypari at Library of Congress 
Permalink to 'Sources on Social and Economic history of Rajasthan' at Library of Congress 
Permalink to Sindayacha Dayaldas at Library of Congress 
Permalink to Bikaner ki chitrankan parampara at Library of Congress

References

20th-century Indian historians
Rajasthani people
1938 births
Living people
University of Rajasthan alumni
People from Bikaner
Scientists from Rajasthan
Historians of India